Martin Chlumecký (born 11 January 1997) is a Czech football player who plays for Pardubice on loan Baník Ostrava.

Career
He scored three own goals in his first five Czech First League matches for Dukla, scoring the only goal of Dukla's 1–0 home defeat to Bohemians 1905, followed by both opposition goals in the 2–1 home defeat against 1. FC Slovácko. He joined Vysočina Jihlava on a half-season loan during the winter break of the 2018–19 season.

On 8 September 2022 he was loaned to Pardubice in Czech First League.

References

External links
 
 
 Martin Chlumecký at Footballdatabase

1997 births
Living people
Czech footballers
Association football defenders
FC Slovan Liberec players
FK Varnsdorf players
FK Dukla Prague players
FC Vysočina Jihlava players
FK Teplice players
Czech First League players
Czech National Football League players
FC Baník Ostrava players
FK Pardubice players